General elections were held in East Germany on 14 November 1971. 434 deputies were elected to the Volkskammer, with all of them being candidates of the single-list National Front. 584 Front candidates were put forward, with 434 being elected. The allocation of seats remained unchanged from previous elections.

Results

References

 Inter-Parliamentary Union: HISTORICAL ARCHIVE OF PARLIAMENTARY ELECTION RESULTS - Germany

1971 in East Germany
Elections in East Germany
1971 elections in Germany
November 1971 events in Europe
East Germany